Born of the Storm is a socialist realist novel written by Nikolai Ostrovsky (1904–1936) during Joseph Stalin's era. The novel, begun in January 1924 and concerning the Ukrainian–Soviet War, remains unfinished due to Ostrovsky's death in December 1936.

Plot summary
The action of Born of the Storm goes on in autumnal days of 1918 when Poland was regaining its independence after 123 years of partitions. German occupational forces moved away from Ukrainian territories while local Polish legioners had been formed with dreams of adding some Ukrainian, Belarusian and Lithuanian lands to the Polish state bordering on the ruins of Russian, German and Austro-Hungarian empires.

External links 
Born of the Storm at Open Library
Nikolai Ostrovsky
Socrealist novels
Unfinished novels
War novels
Novels set in the 1910s
Fiction set in 1918